Hingoli Assembly constituency is one of the 288 Vidhan Sabha (legislative assembly) constituencies of Maharashtra state, western India. This constituency is located in Hingoli district. The delimitation of the constituency happened in 2008.

Geographical scope
The constituency comprises Sengaon Taluka, parts of Hingoli Taluka, revenue
circles of Malhiwara, Narsi, Hingoli and Hingoli municipal council.

Members of Legislative assembly

Election Results

2014 Vidhan Sabha
 Tanaji Mutkute (BJP) : 97,045 votes 
 Bhaurao Patil (Congress) : 40,599
 Dilip Chavan (NCP) : 21897
 Sahebrao Sirsat (BSP) : 9,731
 Dinkar Deshmukh (Shiv Sena) : 6,397

1967 Vidhan Sabha
 Chandrakant Patil (SSP) : 22,520 votes
 N. Lokavarkhe (INC) : 17295

References

Assembly constituencies of Maharashtra
Hingoli district